Arnold O. Benz (born 21 April 1945) is a professor emeritus at the Institute for Particle Physics and Astrophysics in the Physics Department of ETH Zurich.

Education and career
Benz was educated at ETH Zurich, where he was awarded a diploma in theoretical physics in 1969. He then went to Cornell University in Ithaca, New York, where he received a PhD in astrophysics for his research on the acceleration of the solar wind in 1973, under the supervision of Thomas Gold. After his return to ETH Zurich as a postdoc he focused on plasma physical processes in the solar corona. He led the Research Group on Radio Astronomy at the Institute for Astronomy from 1974 to 2010. In 1974 he became a lecturer at the Physics Department and in 1993 he was nominated professor for physics with focus on astrophysics. He is professor emeritus at ETH Zurich since 2010 and continues to work at the Institute for Particle Physics and Astrophysics and part-time at Fachhochschule Nordwestschweiz (FHNW) in Windisch, Switzerland.

Research and achievements
Benz is well known for his observations and interpretation of the solar radio emission (ultra high frequency)   and particle acceleration in solar and stellar flares with more than four hundred scholarly publications. The Güdel-Benz relation between radio and X-ray emission of flares was named after him. Together with his student Säm Krucker Benz first detected heating events in the solar atmosphere that are now considered the most promising explanation for the high temperature of the corona. More recently, Benz studied star formation using molecular line observations by the Herschel Space Observatory.

Benz presided several scientific committees, such as the Swiss Society for Astrophysics and Astronomy (1999–2002) and Division II (Sun and Heliosphere) of the International Astronomical Union (2000–2003). Markus Aschwanden (Lockheed Martin), Marina Battaglia (FHNW), Simon Bruderer (MPI Garching), André Csillaghy (FHNW), Manuel Güdel (Wien), Heinz Isliker (Tessaloniki), Säm Krucker (FHNW and UC Berkeley), Pascal Saint-Hilaire (UC Berkeley), and Susanne Wampfler (Bern) are among his former graduate students.

To the public at large, Benz is known for his numerous presentations on astronomy at the popular level, most prominently on Swiss television and radio since 1979, as well as for his several books on the interdisciplinary dialog between natural sciences and religion. He emphasizes the new perspectives that today's astrophysical findings open up for the concept of divine creation and highlights that this belief is based on participating perceptions and religious experiences that are fundamentally different from scientific observations.  He received an honorary doctorate from the Faculty of Theology of the University of Zurich for his merits.The University of the South (Sewanee, TN, USA) awarded him 2017 an honorary doctor's degree in Science "for his distinguished contributions to astronomical inquiry and for his illuminating, interdisciplinary reflections".

Books and articles (selection)
 Plasma Astrophysics. Kinetic Processes in Solar and Stellar Coronae. 2nd ed. Kluwer, Dordrecht 2002, 
 Astrophysics and Creation: Perceiving the Universe Through Science and Participation. Crossroads Publishing, New York 2016, .
 The Future of the Universe: Chance, Chaos, God? second edition, Continuum Publishing, New York 2002, .
 Meaningless Space? in : George, Mark/ Pezzoli-Olgiati, Daria (eds.), Meaningful Spaces. Religious Representations in Place, New York: Palgrave Macmillan, 23–34 (2014).
 Astrophysics and Creation: Perceiving the Universe Through Science and Participation. Zygon: Journal of Religion and Science, 52, 186-195 (2017).
 Mission to Saturn: The Story of a Debate about Science and God. (with Samuel Vollenweider) Crossroads Publishing, New York 2022, .

References

External links 
 Publications by Arnold Benz in the Astrophysics Data System
  
 Literature of and about Arnold Benz in the catalogue of the German National Library
 personal website
 ETH Zurich website
 Catherine M. Wallace: Unlikely Theologians and the Coleridgean Imagination  Anglican Theological Review, vol. 86, no. 1 (2004), 189-202

1945 births
21st-century Swiss writers
20th-century Swiss physicists
21st-century Swiss physicists
Swiss astrophysicists
Cornell University alumni
Academic staff of ETH Zurich
Swiss male writers
Living people
Swiss science writers
ETH Zurich alumni